The 1954 International Cross Country Championships was held in Birmingham, England, at the Bromford Bridge Racecourse on 27 March 1954.  In addition, an unofficial women's championship was held one week earlier at the same place on 20 March 1954.  A preview on the men's event, a report on the men's results as well as the women's results was given in the Glasgow Herald.

Complete results for men, and for women (unofficial), medallists, 
 and the results of British athletes were published.

Medallists

Individual Race results

Men's (9 mi / 14.5 km)

Women's (2.5 mi / 4.0 km, unofficial)

Team results

Men's

Women's (unofficial)

Participation

Men's
An unofficial count yields the participation of 62 athletes from 7 countries.

 (9)
 (9)
 (9)
 (9)
 (9)
 (8)
 (9)

Women's
An unofficial count yields the participation of 12 female athletes from 2 countries.

 (6)
 (6)

See also
 1954 in athletics (track and field)

References

International Cross Country Championships
International Cross Country Championships
Cross
International Cross Country Championships
International Cross Country Championships
Cross country running in the United Kingdom
Sport in Birmingham, West Midlands
1950s in Birmingham, West Midlands